The 1992 Northwestern Wildcats team represented Northwestern University during the 1992 NCAA Division I-A football season. In their first year under head coach Gary Barnett, the Wildcats compiled a 3–8 record (3–5 against Big Ten Conference opponents) and finished in ninth place in the Big Ten Conference.

The team's offensive leaders were quarterback Len Williams with 2,110 passing yards, Dennis Lundy with 688 rushing yards, and Lee Gissendaner with 846 receiving yards. Gissendaner was also selected by the Associated Press as a first-team wide receiver on the 1992 All-Big Ten Conference football team.

Schedule

References

Northwestern
Northwestern Wildcats football seasons
Northwestern Wildcats football